Ditto is a 1937 American short comedy film featuring Buster Keaton.

Plot
Buster Keaton plays a delivery man who falls in love with one of his customers.  Little does he know, though, that her twin lives right next door.

Cast
 Buster Keaton as The Forgotten Man
 Gloria Brewster as Housewife
 Barbara Brewster as Housewife's twin sister
 Harold Goodwin as Hank
 Lynton Brent as Bill
 Al Thompson
 Robert Ellsworth

See also
 Buster Keaton filmography

External links

 Ditto at the International Buster Keaton Society

1937 films
1937 comedy films
1937 short films
American black-and-white films
Educational Pictures short films
Films directed by Charles Lamont
American comedy short films
1930s American films